Hridayesh Tripathi is a Nepalese politician, belonging to the  People's Progressive Party. He's also the current chairman of the party.

A former Minister of Health and Population Tripathi has worked several terms as minister under the government of Nepali Congress and CPN (UML).

Early life and education 
Tripathi was born in Nawalparasi to Harishankar Triphati and Kunti Devi. He completed his secondary education in Palpa and studied political science at the Institute of Oriental Studies in the Soviet Union.

Political career 
He started his political career in Communist Party of Nepal (Rayamajhi). He contested the 1986 Rastriya Panchayat elections but failed to get elected. After the non-partisan panchayat system was removed and democracy was re-established in Nepal by the 1990 Nepalese revolution, Triphathi joined the Nepal Sadbhawana Party. He was elected to the House of Representatives from Nawalparasi 3 in the 1991 elections and retained his seat in the 1994 and 1999 elections.

In the wake of the Madhesh movement in 2007, Tripathi resigned from the government of Girija Prasad Koirala and formed the Terai Madhesh Loktantrik Party with Mahantha Thakur. He was elected to the 1st Nepalese Constituent Assembly at the 2008 elections from Nawalparasi 6 but failed to retain his seat at the 2013 elections. 
In 2017, he quit the Rastriya Janata Party Nepal and formed the Independent Political Group that contested the 2017 elections under the election symbol of CPN (Unified Marxist–Leninist). He was elected to the House of Representatives from Nawalparasi West 1 and was a member of the CPN (UML) parliamentary party. 

On 14 December 2021, he announced the formation of People's Progressive Party. He emphasized the need of a party concentrated towards agrarianism, ideological debate and addressing the demands of Madhesh and Tharuhat region which were not included in constitution.

Personal life 
Tripathi is married to Shobha Tripathi with whom he has two daughters and a son.

Electoral history

See also 
 People's Progressive Party
 Terai Madhesh Loktantrik Party

References 

1959 births
Living people
People from Nawalparasi District
People's Progressive Party (Nepal) politicians
Nepal MPs 2017–2022
Nepal Communist Party (NCP) politicians
Nepal MPs 1991–1994
Nepal MPs 1994–1999
Nepal MPs 1999–2002

Members of the 1st Nepalese Constituent Assembly
Communist Party of Nepal (Unified Marxist–Leninist) politicians
Terai Madhesh Loktantrik Party politicians
Nepal Sadbhawana Party politicians